District Number 7 School, also known as Speedsville School, is a historic one room school building located at Speedsville in Tompkins County, New York, U.S.A. It was built about 1850 and is a one-story, 30 feet wide by 50 feet deep, frame structure. The building was used as a school until 1956 and is now a Sunday school and community center for the adjacent St. John's Episcopal Church.

It was listed on the National Register of Historic Places in 2004.

References

One-room schoolhouses in New York (state)
Schoolhouses in the United States
School buildings on the National Register of Historic Places in New York (state)
School buildings completed in 1850
Schools in Tompkins County, New York
National Register of Historic Places in Tompkins County, New York